The Last Gallop (Spanish: El último galope) is a 1951 Chilean film directed by Luis A. Morales and Enrique Soto Toro.

Cast
 Gerardo Grez 
 Plácido Martín 
 Yoya Martinez
 Raúl Zenteno

References

Bibliography 
 Carlos Ossa Coo. Historia del cine chileno. Empresa Editora Nacional Quimantú, 1971.

External links 
 

1951 films
1950s Spanish-language films
Chilean black-and-white films